Philippe Hinschberger (born 19 November 1959) is a French football manager and former player who is manager of Ligue 2 side Amiens.

Playing career
Hinschberger was a one-club man, having spent his entire career with Metz.

Managerial career
After retiring as a player, Hinschberger managed CS Louhans-Cuiseaux, Chamois Niortais and Le Havre; he was the manager of Laval from 2007 to 2014. Hinschberger was manager of Créteil in 2014. He joined Metz in December 2015, and was sacked on 22 October 2017, after nine defeats in ten games at the start of the 2017–18 season.

On 17 June 2021, Hinschberger left Grenoble to join fellow Ligue 2 side Amiens.

Honours
Metz
Coupe de France: 1983–84, 1987–88
Coupe de la Ligue: 1985–86

References

1959 births
Living people
People from Algrange
Sportspeople from Moselle (department)
French footballers
Footballers from Grand Est
Association football midfielders
FC Metz players
Ligue 1 players
French football managers
Ligue 1 managers
Ligue 2 managers
Chamois Niortais F.C. managers
Le Havre AC managers
Stade Lavallois managers
Louhans-Cuiseaux FC managers
US Créteil-Lusitanos managers
FC Metz managers
Grenoble Foot 38 managers
Amiens SC managers